The highest-selling albums and EPs in the United States are ranked in the Billboard 200, which is published by Billboard magazine. The data are compiled by Nielsen Soundscan based on each album's weekly physical and digital sales, as well as on-demand streaming and digital sales of its individual tracks.

In 2017, a total of 38 albums claimed the top position of the chart. Beginning with vocal group Pentatonix's Christmas album, A Pentatonix Christmas, issue dated January 7, another one of which, Canadian singer The Weeknd's third studio album, Starboy returned to the top slot a week later after three weeks from the slot, issue dated December 17, 2016.

Ed Sheeran's third studio album, ÷ (Divide) was the most consumed album of 2017 with 2.764 million equivalent album units with 1.1 million of that sum coming from traditional album sales according to Nielsen Music. Kendrick Lamar's fourth studio album Damn was the second best-selling album of 2017 with 2.747 million equivalent album units according to Nielsen Music. Taylor Swift's sixth studio album, Reputation, was the best-selling album of 2017 with 1.9 million sales, and the third most consumed, with 2.336 million units moved in 2017.

Rapper Future also made Billboard history releasing two different albums in a week apart: his fifth self-titled album and sixth follow-up, Hndrxx. Both managed to peak atop the chart. Aside from A Pentatonix Christmas, Starboy, ÷, More Life, Damn and Reputation, the only two number-ones with extended chart runs include: Grateful by DJ Khaled and 4:44 by Jay-Z, four of which spent only two weeks at the top position.

Chart history

See also
 2017 in American music
 List of Billboard Hot 100 number ones of 2017

References

2017
United States Albums